HD 105382 (also known as V863 Centauri) is a star in the constellation Centaurus. Its apparent magnitude is 4.47. From parallax measurements, it is located 130 parsecs (440 light years) from the sun.

HD 105382 is a variable star whose apparent magnitude varies with an amplitude of 0.012 over a period of 1.295 days. It has been previously classified as a Be star, which would explain the variability as stellar pulsations, but this classification was probably due to accidental observation of the nearby Be star δ Centauri. A 2004 study showed that the 1.295 day period is actually the rotation period of the star, and that the variability is caused by non-homogeneous distribution of elements in the stellar surface. In particular, HD 105382 is a helium-weak chemically peculiar star with a helium abundance varying between 0.5% and 15% of the solar abundance, and a silicon abundance varying between 0.00044% and 0.0069% the solar value. Regions with more helium appear to coincide with the regions with less silicon, and vice versa. This peculiar abundance pattern is probably related to HD 105382's magnetic field, which has a polar strength of 2.3 kG.

From astrometric measurements by the Hipparcos spacecraft, HD 105382 is identified as a probable astrometric binary. It is only 267" away from δ Centauri, and both stars appear to be at the same distance from Earth and have the same motion through space, so they may be related. In total, this may be a five star system. It is a member of the Lower Centaurus–Crux (LCC) subgroup of the Scorpius–Centaurus association.

References

Centaurus (constellation)
B-type giants
Variable stars
Centauri, V863
Durchmusterung objects
105382
059173
4618
Helium-weak stars
Astrometric binaries
Lower Centaurus Crux